Shamlian is an Armenian surname. It may refer to:

Janet Shamlian, American television reporter of Armenian origin
Souren Shamlian, Armenian Turkish journalist, founder and publisher of the Armenian newspaper Marmara

See also
Armenian Evangelical Shamlian Tatigian Secondary School, Armenian school, in Bourdj Hamoud, Lebanon